Unwin Cove is a cove immediately southeast of Toro Point, Trinity Peninsula. The cove was charted by the Chilean Antarctic Expedition, 1947–48, which named it for First Lieutenant Tomas Unwin Lambie, a naval officer of this expedition and the commander of the ship 1949-50 and 1950–51.

Coves of Graham Land
Landforms of Trinity Peninsula